The zucchetto (also , , ; meaning "small gourd", from zucca, "pumpkin"; plural in English: zucchettos) or solideo, officially a pileolus, is a small, hemispherical, form-fitting ecclesiastical skullcap worn by clerics of various Catholic churches, the Syriac Orthodox Church, and by senior clergy in Anglicanism. 

It is also called a pilus, pilos, pileus, pileolo, subbiretum, submitrale, soli deo, berrettino, calotte or calotta.

History
The zucchetto originated as the Greek pilos and is related to the beret (which itself was originally a large zucchetto). It was adopted circa the Early Middle Ages or earlier, to keep clerics' heads warm. Its name derives from its resemblance to half a pumpkin. It is almost identical to the Jewish kippah or yarmulke, and this resemblance is often considered to have been deliberate (as a reminder of Jesus’ and Christianity’s Jewish roots), though its religious significance is ultimately quite different.

Construction and design

In Catholicism, the modern zucchetto is most commonly made of silk or polyester fabric. The design utilises eight gores or triangular panels that are joined at the tips to form a hemispherical skullcap. Jutting from the central tip of the zucchetto is the "stem", known as stirpis or stirpes. It is made of a twisted loop of silk cord and is meant to make handling the zucchetto easier. The stirpes is the primary visual distinction between the zucchetto and the Jewish kippah.

The zucchetto traditionally has a lining of thin leather (chamois) as an insulator; this is also to help keep the shape of the zucchetto. Inside the trim, there is a strip of velvet to ensure a secure and comfortable fit. Most modern zucchetto designs include a cloth lining, and the contemporary trend is using ordinary synthetic cloth with a simple, natural cloth lining.

Colors 
The color of the zucchetto in Catholicism denotes the wearer's rank:

  the pope's zucchetto is white;
  those worn by cardinals are scarlet;
  those of archbishops, bishops, territorial abbots and territorial prelates are amaranth;
  and regular abbots, priests and deacons wear a black zucchetto.

The use of the black zucchetto by priests and deacons is generally uncommon and widely considered an  eccentricity. Some friar-preachers have adopted the practice of wearing a brown zucchetto to match their brown habit. The pope customarily wears a white zucchetto to match his white cassock.

The most common Anglican design can be similar to the Catholic zucchetto or, far more often, similar to the Jewish kippah. A form of the zucchetto is worn by Anglican bishops and is used approximately like that of the Catholic Church. The Anglican "skullcap" differs from the zucchetto primarily in that it is made of six panels, bears a button at centre of the crown, and is of slightly larger dimensions. The other exception is Anglican churches usually (but not always) differ from the Catholic "church violet" for bishops, and instead use purple.

It is always black and embroidered with black Orthodox crosses.

Usage
All ordained men in the Latin Rite of the Catholic Church are entitled to wear the black zucchetto unless promoted to a higher rank, and it is worn with either the cassock or liturgical vestments. When a biretta or mitre is worn, a zucchetto is always worn underneath; hence its other names of subbirettum and submitrale.  The zucchetto is never worn with a suit. Amaranth and scarlet zucchetti are considered a symbolic honor granted to the prelate. Thus, the prelate is privileged to wear his zucchetto, not entitled.

The common tradition is for the cleric to obtain the zucchetto either from an ecclesiastical tailor or a retail church supply. There is also a tradition of friends buying a newly appointed bishop his first zucchetto.

A lower-ranking prelate must always doff his skullcap to a higher-ranking prelate; all prelates must remove their zucchetti in the presence of the pope, unless the pope says not to do so.

The zucchetto is worn throughout most of the Mass, is removed at the commencement of the Preface, and replaced at the conclusion of Communion, when the Blessed Sacrament is put away. The zucchetto is also not worn at any occasion where the Blessed Sacrament is exposed. A short zucchetto stand known as a funghellino ("little mushroom", usually made of brass or wood) can be placed near the altar to provide a safe place for the zucchetto when it is not being worn.

Prelates often give away their skullcaps to the faithful. The practice, which was started in the modern era by Pope Pius XII, involves giving the zucchetto to the faithful, as a keepsake, if presented with a new one as a gift. Popes John Paul II, Benedict XVI, and Francis have continued the custom. The pope might choose not to give the visitor his own zucchetto, but rather place the gift zucchetto on his head for a moment as a blessing, then return it to the giver. Bishops, cardinals and archbishops such as Fulton J. Sheen frequently gave their old zucchettos in exchange for the newly offered one; Sheen also gave his zucchetto as a keepsake to laity who requested it.

See also

Taqiyah (cap)
Skufia
Philippi Collection
Kippah or yarmulke

Notes

References

Footnotes

Bibliography

Further reading

 

Anglican vestments
History of clothing
History of clothing (Western fashion)
History of fashion
Papal vestments
Religious headgear
Catholic clerical clothing
Roman Catholic vestments